Van Baalen is a Dutch surname. Notable people with the surname include:

Coby van Baalen (born 1957), Dutch equestrian
Hans van Baalen (1960–2021), Dutch politician
Marlies van Baalen (born 1980), Dutch equestrian
Vinus van Baalen (1942–2012), Dutch swimmer

Dutch-language surnames